Lies, Damn Lies and Statistics may refer to:

 "Lies, Damn Lies and Statistics" (The West Wing), a first-season episode of the TV series The West Wing
 Lies, damned lies, and statistics, a phrase describing the persuasive power of numbers